The 1943–44 Gauliga Bayern was the eleventh season of the league, one of the 31 Gauligas in Germany at the time. It was the first tier of the football league system in Bavaria (German:Bayern) from 1933 to 1945. It was the second and last season of the league being sub-divided into a northern and southern division, the Gauliga Nordbayern and Gauliga Südbayern, with further sub-dividing taking place in the uncompleted 1944–45 season.

For FC Bayern Munich it was the only Gauliga championship while, for 1. FC Nürnberg, it was the seventh and last the club would win in the era from 1933 to 1944. Unlike TSV 1860 in the previous season FC Bayern did not receive an invitation by the Lord Mayor of Munich, Karl Fiehler, to celebrate their title at the town hall, the club having been unpopular with the Nazis because of its past Jewish connections. Both Gauliga champions qualified for the 1944 German football championship, where Bayern Munich was knocked out in the first preliminary round after losing 2–1 to VfR Mannheim while Nürnberg lost 3–1 to eventual winners Dresdner SC in the semi finals.

Table
The 1943–44 saw a number of Kriegsspielgemeinschaft teams compete in the league, shortened as KSG. The KSG's were unified teams formed from two or more clubs but not mergers of these clubs.

North 
The 1943–44 season saw two new clubs in the league, WTSV Schweinfurt and KSG Post/Reichsbahn Nürnberg/Fürth.

South 
The 1943–44 season saw two new clubs in the league, KSG MTV/VfB Ingolstadt and TSV Pfersee.

References

Sources

External links
 Das Deutsche Fussball Archiv  Historic German league tables

1943-44
1